Purcell's Harbour is a local service district and designated place in the Canadian province of Newfoundland and Labrador. It is on the southern Twillingate island, about  outside the town of Twillingate, near the community of Little Harbour.

History 
Purcell's Harbour was considered to be settled in the late 18th century, but no separate census was kept for individual communities within the area of Twillingate. The first time it was recorded separately was in 1911 when it had a population of 77.

Geography 
Purcell's Harbour is in Newfoundland within Subdivision I of Division No. 8. The community has a small natural harbour which opens up into Main Tickle, which separates Twillingate Island from New World Island.

Demographics 

Government 
Purcell's Harbour is a local service district (LSD) that is governed by a committee responsible for the provision of certain services to the community. The chair of the LSD committee is Leo Anstey.

See also 
Back Harbour
Bayview, Newfoundland and Labrador
Crow Head
Durrell, Newfoundland and Labrador
List of communities in Newfoundland and Labrador
List of designated places in Newfoundland and Labrador
List of local service districts in Newfoundland and Labrador

References 

Designated places in Newfoundland and Labrador
Local service districts in Newfoundland and Labrador